Breezy is the tenth studio album by American singer Chris Brown, released on June 24, 2022 as the follow-up to his 2019 album Indigo. The artists featured on the album are Lil Wayne, Anderson .Paak, Blxst, Lil Baby, H.E.R., EST Gee, Wizkid, Jack Harlow, Tory Lanez, Fivio Foreign, Ella Mai, Yung Bleu, Capella Grey, Lil Durk, Davido and Bryson Tiller. The album marks his first studio album not being a double-disc since his 2015 album Royalty.

The album debuted at number four on the US Billboard 200, making it his lowest charting album in the country since Graffiti (2009). Breezy was preceded by three singles; "Iffy", "WE (Warm Embrace)" and "Call Me Every Day".

Background and recording 
Chris Brown started working on the album simultaneously with the release of his ninth studio album Indigo. The singer said in July 2021, while working on the album, that he wanted to make some "really endearing music" that "talk to women's soul". In February 2022, he stated on his Instagram account that the album would contain some pure R&B material. He later said that on some of the album's songs he wanted to depict "a different type of love mixed with heartbreak". The recording sessions for Breezy ended during the first days of June 2022, with the track "Need You Right Here" being the last one made for the project. During the album's work, the singer stated that he recorded almost 250 songs. During an interview with Big Boy, one week before Breezys release, the singer said that the project is more targeted towards his female audience.

 Artwork 
[[File:Breezy hothead.jpg|thumb|Brown's haircut designed for Breezys artwork]]
Breezy artwork was revealed on May 18, 2022. The cover art consists of a black and white picture of the back of Brown's head with the album's title shaved into his hair. The haircut was done by American artist and barber Rob the Original. According to the barber, the haircut of the album's cover was designed by Brown and himself, and was inspired by works of Italian artist and barber Nto Hair Mugen. Shawn Grant of The Source found the artwork to be "minimal" compared to those of Brown's latest projects.

Composition
Breezy is an R&B record, containing a trap-driven first half, that includes most of the album's features, and a second half channelled into a soul soundscape, where Brown executes most of the album's solo performances. The album, with its 23 tracks, marks a departure from the singer's previous double-disc projects Heartbreak on a Full Moon and Indigo.

Breezy'''s opener is the hip hop track "Till the Wheels Fall Off", featuring Lil Durk and Capella Grey, that runs for 5 minutes and 14 seconds, having a chorus that Brown executes singing with a bass voice and "intense" harmonies. Lyrically, on the song the artists give a hopeful introspection over their emotional struggles caused by their personal life's harshest challenges. The second track "Catch a Body", featuring Fivio Foreign, mixes R&B and drill music, containing swaggering lyrics. The following track, "Pitch Black", is an R&B mid-tempo with sexual themes, with an intro performed by Anderson .Paak. On "Possessive" Yung Bleu, Lil Wayne and Brown explore themes of jealousy, breakup and lovesickness, through a tone that was described by Miracle Oyedeji of The Inquirer as a "mixture of loving and nagging". "Need You Right Here", "Hmhmm", and "Addicted" are trap-influenced R&B tracks with debaucherous themes. "Survive the Night" is an alternative R&B track about drug addiction, where the singer approaches drugs as a lover that keeps hurting him, but he can't get rid off her from his emotions. Oyedeji stated that the track is reminiscent of some material off Brown's 2017 album Heartbreak on a Full Moon.

The thirteenth track, the R&B and soul slow-jam "Sleep at Night", marks a change of tone on the album, into a slower "soulful" soundscape. The track was noted for showcasing the singer's timbre and falsetto. "Passing Time" is an "80's inspired" mid-tempo where the singer is conversing with his lover asking for reassurance. "WE (Warm Embrace)" is an R&B slow-jam, that contains an interpolation of Guy's 1991 single "Let's Chill". Keithan Samuels of Rated R&B commented its. lyrical content saying that it "shows the tender side of Brown as he aims to sexually please his stressed-out partner the best way he can". "Dream", "Slide" and "Harder" are pure R&B tracks, that mix romantic and sexual themes. The album's standard edition ends with "Luckiest Man", a song where Brown croons his confidence of wanting to spend the rest of his life with his loved one.

Critical reception

Miracle Oyedeji of The Inquirer stated that the album consists of "24 solid songs" with Brown doing "amazingly well vocally and lyrically". AllMusic editor Andy Kellman praised Breezys "soulful" side, stating that it "contains some of the smoothest R&B he has made", but was dissatisfied with its "boastful" hip hop-infused side. Lauren Floyd of HipHopDX expressed a mixed response, stating that on the album "certain songs sway from trend to trend or the preferences of its features mask more than advertising Brown’s individuality".

Release and promotion

On November 4, 2019, Brown posted three videos that showed snippets from songs that he recently worked on, supposedly called "Get Naked", "Hit My Line" and "Stressed". On December 22, 2019, Brown announced that he was working on new material for his next album, posting an Instagram story where he wrote  "2020, what do you think my 10th album is going to be called?". A couple months following the release of his collaborative mixtape with Young Thug, Slime & B, on July 9, 2020, he announced that the name of his tenth album would be Breezy, making a reference to his stage nickname. On October 22, 2020 he shared through his social media a snippet of a song supposedly called "On Some New Shit", in a video that showed him working and recording the song in a hotel room in London, also suggesting the possibility of releasing the album in 2021 in the video's caption. In November, Brown created an OnlyFans account, where he posted snippets from the songs "Sleep at Night" and "Warm Embarce", during his travel in Tulum, Mexico. Two days before Christmas 2020, Brown posted on his Instagram account a picture that showed a pen and a piece of paper, captioning it with "My heart on this pen and pad. A SIDE B SIDE. Hope y'all f**k with my frequency. No time soon", hinting the possibility of Breezy being his third consecutive double-album, following Heartbreak on a Full Moon and Indigo. On January 8, 2021 Forbes published an article that listed Breezy among the most anticipated R&B albums of 2021. In June 2021 he said that he was not in a rush to release his new album, by posting an Instagram story where he wrote "I ain't dropping my album until I'm ready. I need to give y'all a chance to miss me". On August 2, 2021, Brown announced on his Instagram that his Breezy album would be accompanied by a short film of the same name.

Months later, on December 18, he announced the release of the lead single of Breezy for January 2022. On the first day of 2022 he announced the title of the single, "Iffy", through a teaser of its music video, announcing its release for January 14. In March he announced that the already previewed song "Warm Embrace" would be the second single, announcing its release date for April 1, and teasing a joint tour for Summer 2022 with a mystery co-headliner. Two days before the release of the single, he revealed that Breezy would be released during summer 2022. In late April he announced his "One of Them Ones Tour" with rapper Lil Baby as a co-headlining act. On May 9 he announced that the album would be released in June. Nine days later he revealed Breezy release date, June 24, along with its cover art, and a list of features including Lil Wayne, Blxst, H.E.R., Ella Mai, Jack Harlow, Tory Lanez, Fivio Foreign, Yung Bleu, EST Gee and Wizkid, hinting that more features could be on the album.

Brown unveiled most of the album's track listing on June 7, while also posting a video of him dancing to a snippet of "Possessive". Two weeks before the album's release, Brown has debuted the track "Wheels Fall Off", performing the track for the first time for the "4ShootersOnly" music platform, in a video portraying himself alone with a microphone in his backyard, while he smokes a blunt and executes the song. That same day he posted a snippet of "Call Me Every Day", featuring Nigerian artist WizKid, on his Instagram account. On June 21, he released the music video for "WE (Warm Embrace)", starring Normani and directed by Arrad.

Commercial performance
In the United States, Breezy debuted at number four on the US Billboard 200 with 72,000 album-equivalent units, which included 5,000 pure album sales in its first week, making it his 11th top-ten album in the country. The album also accumulated 87.36 million on-demand audio streams in the United States for its track list of 24 songs. Five songs from Breezy charted on the Billboard Hot 100 during its debut week, making Chris Brown surpass Elvis Presley as the eighth artist with the most entries on the Hot 100, for a total of 112 entries on the chart. In its second week, the album remained in the top ten and fell to number eight, earning 35,000 album-equivalent units. The album spent three consecutive weeks in the top ten of the Billboard'' 200.

Track listingNotes "Pitch Black" features uncredited vocals by Anderson .PaakSample credits'
 "Psychic" contains a sample from "Me & U", written by Ryan Leslie, as performed by Cassie.
 "WE (Warm Embrace)" contains a portion of the composition "Let's Chill", written by Bernard Belle, Teddy Riley, Keith Sweat, as performed by Guy.
 "Dream" contains a sample from "What They Want", written by Joe Moses, Kaniel Castaneda, as performed by Joe Moses.
 "Harder" contains a portion of the composition "Untitled (How Does It Feel)", written by D'Angelo, Raphael Saadiq, as performed by D'Angelo
 "Iffy" contains a sample from "Drag Rap" by The Showboys and contains interpolations of "In Da Club", written by Curtis Jackson, Andre Young & Mike Elizondo, as performed by 50 Cent & "Never Leave You (Uh Oooh, Uh Oooh)", written by Lumidee Cedeño, Teddy Mendez, Edwin Perez, Steven Marsden, as performed by Lumidee.

Charts

Weekly charts

Year-end charts

References

2022 albums
Chris Brown albums
RCA Records albums
Soul albums by American artists
Albums produced by OG Parker
Albums produced by RoccStar
Trap music albums